Cycling has been contested at the Summer Paralympic Games since 1984. Australia first competed at the Seoul Games and won its first cycling medals at the Atlanta Games.  Cycling is Australia's third most successful Paralympic medal sport behind athletics and swimming.

Leading medalists

 
As of the 2012 Games.

Summer Paralympic Games

1996

Australia won 5 gold and 5 silver medals.

2000

Australia won 10 gold, 3 silver and 8 bronze medals.

2004
Australia won 10 gold, 7 silver and 7 bronze medals.

2008
Australia won 3 gold, 5 silver and 7 bronze medals.

2012
Australia won 6 gold, 4 silver and 4 bronze medals.

See also
 Australian Paralympic Cycling Team
 Cycling at the Summer Paralympics
 Australia at the Paralympics

External links
 Cycling Australia's Paralympic Games

References

Paralympic cyclists of Australia
Cycling